There are many public artworks displayed in Mexico City, including murals and outdoor sculptures.

Murals
 Day and Night
 The History of Mexico

Outdoor sculptures

 Abraham Lincoln: The Man
 Angel of Independence
 Ariadna abandonada
 Beethoven Monument
 Benito Juárez Hemicycle
 Bust of Albert Einstein
 Bust of Cuauhtémoc
 Bust of Pedro Domingo Murillo
 Dolor
 Diana the Huntress Fountain, Paseo de la Reforma
 El Ángel de la Seguridad Social
 El Caballito
 El Sereno
 Equestrian statue of Charles IV of Spain
 Equestrian statue of Francisco I. Madero
 Flor de Fango (1908)
 Fountain of Mercury, Alameda Central
 Fountain of Neptune, Alameda Central
 Fountain of Venus, Alameda Central
 Fountain of Virgin, Alameda Central
 Fountain to Bartolomé de las Casas
 Fuente de Cibeles
 Fuente de los Cántaros
 Gladiador frigio
 Gladiador romano
 How Doth the Little Crocodile, Paseo de la Reforma
 Isaac
 La Primavera
 Las Danaides, Alameda Central
 Malgré Tout, Alameda Central
 Monument to Christopher Columbus (Buenavista, Mexico City)
 Monument to Christopher Columbus (Paseo de la Reforma)
 Monument to Cuauhtémoc, Paseo de la Reforma
 Monument to Enrico Martínez
 Monument to Lázaro Cárdenas
 Monument to Pope John Paul II
 Monumento a los Niños Héroes
 Monumento de la Fundación de México-Tenochtitlan
 Mother's Monument
 Mustafa Kemal Atatürk Monument
 Obelisco a los Niños Héroes
 País de volcanes (2003)
 Puerta 1808
 Statue of Alexander von Humboldt, Alameda Central
 Statue of Franklin D. Roosevelt, Chapultepec
  Statue of Heydar Aliyev
 Statue of José Gervasio Artigas
 Statue of León Felipe
 Statue of Louis Pasteur
 Statue of Martin Luther King Jr., Lincoln Park
 Statue of Paul P. Harris, American Park
 Statue of Tin Tan
 Statue of Vicente Guerrero
 Statues of Pegasus
 Tlalli (proposed)
 Torres de Satélite
 Un Pescador

See also

 List of statues on Paseo de la Reforma

Arts in Mexico City
Mexico City
Public art